The Battle of Glođane was fought during the Kosovo War in the village of Glođane first on March 24, 1998, and again later on August 11, 1998. It involved the Kosovo Albanian militant group known as the Kosovo Liberation Army (KLA) and the Yugoslav military and Serbian police forces. The clashes represented a series of military offensives launched by the Yugoslav army and Serbian police to address a growing KLA presence within Kosovo Albanian villages.

Background
In Kosovo, the Kosovo Liberation Army (KLA) forces gained strength and tended to control villages away from the main roads while Yugoslav military forces were positioned on the hills around Lake Radonjić. Throughout the summer of 1998, Yugoslav forces shelled Albanian villages surrounding Lake Radonjić on a daily basis.

Clashes on 24 March 1998 
After the Attack on Prekaz and the killings KLA leaders Adem Jashari and his brother Hamëz Jashari, along with nearly 60 other family members, Yugoslav forces planned a similar Attack on the village of Glođane, which was home to the Haradinaj Clan. On March 24, 1998, hundreds of Yugolsav forces surrounded and besieged Glođane. The Attack began several hours later, while police forces had been monitoring the movements of the Haradinaj Clan. The Yugoslav forces first attacked the House of the Haradinaj Clan and managed to advance to the courtyard, but had to retreat due to military resistance. KLA forces began to take up positions in the village and counter-attacked the Yugoslav forces which resulted in a Yugoslav withdrawal from the village.

During the Battle 2 KLA Fighters and 1 Serbian Officer were killed, while 3 Serbian Officers and Ramush Haradinaj were wounded.

Clashes on 11–12 August 1998
The Yugoslav forces first broke through the KLA lines and entered Glođane around 10–11 August 1998 as reported by BBC Correspondent Jeremey Cooke who was on the scene. He reported that the Serbs "knew they had the upper hand" and had "shelled and machine-gunned" the village of Glođane into submission.  Cooke reported seeing houses shelled and livestock slaughtered to prevent rebels from reentering the village; the Serbian paramilitary police were involved in the operation.

The next military offensive involving Glođane occurred in the beginning of September.  KLA forces had regrouped and in September, the Yugoslav military moved through the villages around the  lake in order to attack and expel the KLA:  Colonel John Crosland an English military officer attached to the VJ, witnessed this first hand commented on the destruction caused by those forces.  He noted that he personally witnessed looting and burning of houses by Yugoslav forces and that the village of Prilep was razed to 18 inches about the ground. He stated that VJ forces, Serbian police forces and paramilitary police forces including (MUP, PJP, SAJ) and JSO (Frenki's boys) were involved in the offensive.

Shortly after capturing Glođane, VJ forces withdrew from the village, which resulted in a returned presence of KLA forces.

During the operation, KLA member Idriz Gashi murdered a civilian suspected of collaborating with Yugoslav police. Her body was dropped into the Radonjić Lake where, along with other bodies, was found in September 1998. Gashi was found guilty and was sentenced to 14 years in prison by the Kosovo Supreme Court in 2010.

See also

Timeline of the Kosovo War

References

Glodjane
Glodjane
1998 in Kosovo
Kosovo Liberation Army
Gjakova
Glodjane
August 1998 events in Europe